In the geometry of hyperbolic 3-space, the order-5 octahedral honeycomb is a regular space-filling tessellation (or honeycomb) with Schläfli symbol {3,4,5}. It has five octahedra {3,4} around each edge. All vertices are ultra-ideal (existing beyond the ideal boundary) with infinitely many octahedra existing around each vertex in an order-5 square tiling vertex arrangement.

Images

Related polytopes and honeycombs 

It a part of a sequence of regular polychora and honeycombs with octahedral cells: {3,4,p}

Order-6 octahedral honeycomb

In the geometry of hyperbolic 3-space, the order-6 octahedral honeycomb is a regular space-filling tessellation (or honeycomb) with Schläfli symbol {3,4,6}. It has six octahedra, {3,4}, around each edge. All vertices are ultra-ideal (existing beyond the ideal boundary) with infinitely many octahedra existing around each vertex in an order-6 square tiling vertex arrangement.

It has a second construction as a uniform honeycomb, Schläfli symbol {3,(4,3,4)}, Coxeter diagram, with alternating types or colors of octahedral cells. In Coxeter notation the half symmetry is [3,4,6,1+] = [3,((4,3,4))].

Order-7 octahedral honeycomb

In the geometry of hyperbolic 3-space, the order-7 octahedral honeycomb is a regular space-filling tessellation (or honeycomb) with Schläfli symbol {3,4,7}. It has seven octahedra, {3,4}, around each edge. All vertices are ultra-ideal (existing beyond the ideal boundary) with infinitely many octahedra existing around each vertex in an order-7 square tiling vertex arrangement.

Order-8 octahedral honeycomb

In the geometry of hyperbolic 3-space, the order-8 octahedral honeycomb is a regular space-filling tessellation (or honeycomb) with Schläfli symbol {3,4,8}. It has eight octahedra, {3,4}, around each edge. All vertices are ultra-ideal (existing beyond the ideal boundary) with infinitely many octahedra existing around each vertex in an order-8 square tiling vertex arrangement.

Infinite-order octahedral honeycomb

In the geometry of hyperbolic 3-space, the infinite-order octahedral honeycomb is a regular space-filling tessellation (or honeycomb) with Schläfli symbol {3,4,∞}. It has infinitely many octahedra, {3,4}, around each edge. All vertices are ultra-ideal (existing beyond the ideal boundary) with infinitely many octahedra existing around each vertex in an infinite-order square tiling vertex arrangement.

It has a second construction as a uniform honeycomb, Schläfli symbol {3,(4,∞,4)}, Coxeter diagram,  = , with alternating types or colors of octahedral cells. In Coxeter notation the half symmetry is [3,4,∞,1+] = [3,((4,∞,4))].

See also 
 Convex uniform honeycombs in hyperbolic space
 List of regular polytopes

References 

Coxeter, Regular Polytopes, 3rd. ed., Dover Publications, 1973. . (Tables I and II: Regular polytopes and honeycombs, pp. 294–296)
 The Beauty of Geometry: Twelve Essays (1999), Dover Publications,  (Chapter 10, Regular Honeycombs in Hyperbolic Space) Table III
 Jeffrey R. Weeks The Shape of Space, 2nd edition  (Chapters 16–17: Geometries on Three-manifolds I,II)
 George Maxwell, Sphere Packings and Hyperbolic Reflection Groups, JOURNAL OF ALGEBRA 79,78-97 (1982) 
 Hao Chen, Jean-Philippe Labbé, Lorentzian Coxeter groups and Boyd-Maxwell ball packings, (2013)
 Visualizing Hyperbolic Honeycombs arXiv:1511.02851 Roice Nelson, Henry Segerman (2015)

External links 
John Baez, Visual insights: {7,3,3} Honeycomb (2014/08/01) {7,3,3} Honeycomb Meets Plane at Infinity (2014/08/14) 
 Danny Calegari, Kleinian, a tool for visualizing Kleinian groups, Geometry and the Imagination 4 March 2014. 

Honeycombs (geometry)